The Kraienkopp or  is a breed of chicken originating on the border region between Germany and the Netherlands. The latter of the two names is the Dutch language version, while the former is German.

History 

The Kraienkopp breed was developed in the late nineteenth century from crosses of local types with Malays, and later with silver duckwing Leghorns. It was first shown in the Netherlands in 1920, and was shown in Germany in 1925.

Characteristics 

The Kraienkopp appears in numerous colour varieties: in the United Kingdom silver, gold, orange/lemon, blue-gold, crele, pile, blue-silver, cuckoo and silver cuckoo are recognised. Males weigh 2.75 kilos (6 pounds), and females weigh 1.8 kilos (4 pounds). They have yellow skin and a small walnut-type comb.

Use 

It is a rare breed, and is usually kept as a layer or as a show bird. Hens lay a fair number of off-white eggs, and will go broody. It is an active bird with excellent foraging abilities.

References

Further reading 

 Carol Ekarius (2007). Storey's Illustrated Guide to Poultry Breeds. North Adams, Massachusetts: Storey Publishing. .
 Chris Graham (2006). Choosing and Keeping Chickens. London: Octopus Publishing. .

Chicken breeds
Chicken breeds originating in the Netherlands
Chicken breeds originating in Germany